Gabriela Stacherová (born 4 February 1980 in Zvolen) is a Slovak slalom canoeist who competed at the international level from 1995 to 2010.

She won a silver medal in the K1 team event at the 2009 ICF Canoe Slalom World Championships in La Seu d'Urgell. At the European Championships she won a total of 7 medals in the K1 team event (2 golds, 4 assists and 1 bronze).

Stacherová also competed in two Summer Olympics, earning her best finish of tenth in the K1 event in Athens in 2004.

World Cup individual podiums

References

12 September 2009 results of the women's K-1 team finals at the 2009 ICF Canoe Slalom World Championships. - accessed 12 September 2009.
Yahoo! Athens 2004 Sports profile

1980 births
Canoeists at the 2000 Summer Olympics
Canoeists at the 2004 Summer Olympics
Living people
Olympic canoeists of Slovakia
Slovak female canoeists
Medalists at the ICF Canoe Slalom World Championships
Sportspeople from Zvolen